Hamed Shirkhanlou is an Iranian football player who last played for Mes Sarcheshmeh of the IPL.

Career
Shirkhanlou played a season for Aboomoslem in 2004. Since 2008, he has been playing for Mes Sarcheshmeh.

References

External sources
 Profile at Persianleague

Living people
Iranian footballers
F.C. Aboomoslem players
Mes Sarcheshme players
Association football forwards
Year of birth missing (living people)